The Mototri Contal was a French automobile manufactured from 1907 until 1908.  More elaborate than most three-wheelers of its era, it featured Roi-des-Belges bodywork on its more expensive models; the company also manufactured delivery tricycles.  Perhaps the high point of the firm's existence was the entry of one of its tricars in the Peking-Paris Race 1907. The car, driven by Auguste Pons, however failed to go very far.

References
David Burgess Wise, The New Illustrated Encyclopedia of Automobiles.

Link
Mototri-Contal (photos & history)
Photos et histoire détaillée

Defunct motor vehicle manufacturers of France